Chas   is a small town on the banks of the river Ghod River in Ambegaon taluka of Pune district in the Indian state of Maharashtra, India.

Geography
This village falls under the Ambegaon Taluka. It is situated 6 km away from sub-district headquarter Ghodegaon and 82 kilometres from Pune. This village falls to the foothill of Sahyadri Mountain range, which is toward the north side of the Pune city.

Female Population is 49.5%. Village literacy rate is 74.0% and the Female Literacy rate is 33.5%.

The total geographical area of village is 360.05 hectares. Chas has a total population of 2,300 peoples. There are about 504 houses in Chas village. It covers the area from Kadewadi, Ganeshwadi, Thakarwadi, Jambhalemala and Chas village.

The nearest Police station is Ghodegaon Police Station.

Agricultural
Agriculture is the main occupation of this village. The most commonly grown crop is Bajara and vegetables, such as potatoes, tomatoes, and onions, and they also produce fruits like grapes and bananas.

The river called Ghod River flows from this village providing the water supply to local farmers. This village is also connected with Dimbhe Dam water canal.

Chas has a good source of water supply from the Dimbhe Dam Canal, Ghod River, and Monsoon rain. It helps the farmer to grow good crops throughout the year.

During the Monsoon 2019, the famous Dnyaneshwar temple was under water.

Due to heavy monsoon rain, Dimbhe Dam has released 22000 cusec water on 29 Aug 2022 in Ghod river.

Education at Chas
Chas has the Primary school till 4th standard and Sant Dnyaneshwar Vidyalaya provides education till 10th standard. The primary school started in 1855.

Sant Dnyaneshwar Vidyalaya started on 13 June 1977. Mr. Shinde Guruji was the principal of the school. Mr. Aaayub Inamdar and Mr. Sambhaji Barve was the first teacher of Sant Dnyaneshwar Vidyalaya.

Post SSC, students either choose a college at Ghodegaon or Manchar for higher studies. For the last many years, SSC passing percentage at Sant Dnyaneshwar Vidyalaya is 100%

Festivals and Temples in Chas
Events like local Yatra, Wrestling, Tamasha and numerous religious observances include Ganesh Chaturthi get celebrated with high enthusiasm.  Chas has many temples which attract devotees from all over the state.

Bullock cart races are an inseparable part of this village which is very prominent throughout Pune district. Photo from 2011 race at Chas.

Chas Villagers are constructing a new Ram Mandir. The old Mandir was 100 years old. Currently, the new temple is under construction.

Tourism
Tourist sites include the Saint Dnyaneshwar Maharaj temple.  At Chas, on the bank of Ghod River, Dashkriya Vidhi (10th ritual after death) of Dnyanoba Mauli's buffalo (reda) took place. The buffalo is said to have died in Aane village and his tomb was constructed on the bank of Chas. Recently, the state government has included Chas village in a list of Grade C pilgrimage places.

Shooting of films like Pak Pak Pakaak ( 2005) - पक पक पकाक  and Gauracha Navra (1988)  completed in Chas.

Leopard attacks in Chas

Leopard population around Chas village has been grown in the last 10 years. Recently, frequency of leopard attacks has been increased and which resulted,  during 2019- early 2020, 5 people has got minor to major injuries. It has been observed that these leopard has adapted the changing land patterns and prefers to live near human habitat for survival.

The local administration has put the plan for leopard safari project in Ambegaon, Junnar taluka.  It will also attract wildlife enthusiasts.

Administration and Politics

The village is administrated by a Sarpanch who is an elected representative of village as per constitution of India and Panchayati raj

Mrs. Sujata Barve is the sarpanch of Chas.

Mr. Baban Maruti Barve is the Sarpanch of Thakarwadi, Chas.

Mrs.Rohinitai Ramdas Kalokhe is the former sarpanch of Chas

Dilip Walse-Patil of Nationalist Congress Party is the current MLA and Cabinet Minister, serves as the Minister of Home Affairs in Government of Maharashtra from Ambegaon Vidhan Sabha constituency.
Dr. Amol Kolhe of Nationalist Congress Party is the current member of parliament (MP) from Shirur (Lok Sabha constituency)

Mrs. Tulsi Sachin Bhor of Nationalist Congress Party is local representative of Kalamb - Chandoli BK (Zilha Parishad Pune)
Mr. Sachin Bhor Patil of Nationalist Congress Party is a youth Leader for Shirur (Lok Sabha constituency).

Shri. Balasaheb G. Shekhar, IPS is a resident of Chas, is currently responsible as DIG Nashik. Mr. Shekhar was the additional CP (crime), Navi Mumbai.

COVID-19 pandemic in Chas

Many local migrants who traveled from Pune and Mumbai were quarantined at Sant Dnyaneshwar Vidyalaya. Strict lock-down was imposed in Chas as per the directives from the Government of Maharashtra

Chas during lockdown:

Transportation
Chas is well connected by public and private transport from Ghodegaon, Manchar  and Kalamb. Chas is just 9 km (5.6 mi) east of Pune - Nashik National Highway 60 (India). Proposed Rail link between Pune – Nashik will help the future connectivity. Pune Airport at Lohegaon is the nearest International and Domestic Airport.

Nearby Attractions
 Bhimashankar Temple, 
 Bhimashankar Wildlife Sanctuary, 
 Vigneshwara Temple, Ozar, 
 Lenyadri, 
 Girawali Observatory, 
 Shivneri, 
 Giant Metrewave Radio Telescope Khodad, 
 Narayangad,
 Government College Of Engineering And Research, Avasari Khurd.

References

External links
 

Cities and towns in Pune district